South Hayward station is a Bay Area Rapid Transit (BART) station located off the Tennyson Road arterial in Hayward, California. The station opened as part of the first segment of the BART system on September 11, 1972.

See also
 List of Bay Area Rapid Transit stations

References

External links

- South Hayward

Bay Area Rapid Transit stations in Alameda County, California
Stations on the Orange Line (BART)
Stations on the Green Line (BART)
Buildings and structures in Hayward, California
Transportation in Hayward, California